Westons Mills may refer to a location in the United States:

Westons Mills, New Jersey
Weston Mills, New York